In the C++ programming language, the C++ Standard Library is a collection of classes and functions, which are written in the core language and part of the C++ ISO Standard itself.

Overview
The C++ Standard Library provides several generic containers, functions to use and manipulate these containers, function objects, generic strings and streams (including interactive and file I/O), support for some language features, and functions for common tasks such as finding the square root of a number. The C++ Standard Library also incorporates most headers of the ISO C standard library ending with ".h", but their use is deprecated (reverted the deprecation since 2003). No other headers in the C++ Standard Library end in ".h". Features of the C++ Standard Library are declared within the std namespace.

The C++ Standard Library is based upon conventions introduced by the Standard Template Library (STL), and has been influenced by research in generic programming and developers of the STL such as Alexander Stepanov and Meng Lee. Although the C++ Standard Library and the STL share many features, neither is a strict superset of the other.

A noteworthy feature of the C++ Standard Library is that it not only specifies the syntax and semantics of generic algorithms, but also places requirements on their performance. These performance requirements often correspond to a well-known algorithm, which is expected but not required to be used. In most cases this requires linear time O(n) or linearithmic time O(n log n), but in some cases higher bounds are allowed, such as quasilinear time O(n log2 n) for stable sort (to allow in-place merge sort). Previously, sorting was only required to take O(n log n) on average, allowing the use of quicksort, which is fast in practice but has poor worst-case performance, but introsort was introduced to allow both fast average performance and optimal worst-case complexity, and as of C++11, sorting is guaranteed to be at worst linearithmic. In other cases requirements remain laxer, such as selection, which is only required to be linear on average (as in quickselect), not requiring worst-case linear as in introselect.

The C++ Standard Library underwent ISO standardization as part of the C++ ISO Standardization effort, and is undergoing further work regarding standardization of expanded functionality.

Implementations

Discontinued

Apache C++ Standard Library
The Apache C++ Standard Library is another open-source implementation. It was originally developed commercially by Rogue Wave Software and later donated to the Apache Software Foundation. However, after more than five years without a release, the board of the Apache Software Foundation decided to end this project and move it to Apache Attic.

See also
The following libraries implement much of the C++ Standard Library:

Standard modules
Ever since the modules were introduced in C++20, there has been no support for standard library modules until C++23. These named modules were added to include all items declared in both global and std namespaces provided by the importable standard headers. Macros are not allowed to be exportable, so users have to manually include or import headers that emit macros for use.

Exports all declarations in namespace std and global storage allocation and deallocation functions that are provided by the importable C++ library headers including C library facilities (although declared in standard namespace).
Exports the same declarations as the named module std, and additionally exports functions in global namespace in C library facilities.

Standard headers
The following files contain the declarations of the C++ Standard Library.

General
New in C++17. Provides a type-erased class std::any.
New in C++11. Provides class template std::atomic, its several template specializations, and more atomic operations.
Provides time elements, such as std::chrono::duration, std::chrono::time_point, and clocks. Since C++20, a hefty amount of temporal features were added: calendars, time zones, more clocks, and string chrono formatting.
New in C++20. Provides fundamental library concepts. 
New in C++23. Provides class template std::expected, a result type.
Provides several function objects, designed for use with the standard algorithms.
New in C++23. Provides a coroutine generator that additionally supports nested yield operations on ranges.
Provides facilities for memory management in C++, including the class template std::unique_ptr.
New in C++17. Provides facilities for creating polymorphic memory allocators whose behaviors can change at runtime.
New in C++11. Provides std::scoped_allocator_adaptor.
Contains standard exception classes such as std::logic_error and std::runtime_error, both derived from std::exception.
New in C++11. Defines std::error_code
New in C++17. Provides class template std::optional, an optional type.
New in C++23. Provides stack trace operations.
New in C++11 and TR1. Provides a class template std::tuple, a tuple.
New in C++11. Provides metaprogramming facilities working with types.
Provides various utilities: class template std::pair (two-member tuples), compile-time integer sequences, helpers in constructing vocabulary types, functions such as std::move and std::forward, and many more. The namespace std::rel_ops for automatically generating comparison operators is deprecated in C++20 in favor of new defaulted comparison operators.
New in C++17. Provides a class template std::variant, a tagged union type.

Language support
New in C++20. Provides three-way comparison operator support.
New in C++20. Provides coroutine support.
Provides several types and functions related to exception handling, including std::exception, the base class of all exceptions thrown by the Standard Library.
New in C++11. Provides initializer list support.
Provides the class template std::numeric_limits, used for describing properties of fundamental numeric types.
Provides operators new and delete and other functions and types composing the fundamentals of C++ memory management.
New in C++20.
New in C++23. Provides conditional support for extended floating-point types.
Provides facilities for working with C++ run-time type information.
New in C++20. Provides information about the implementation of the C++ standard library.

Containers
New in C++11 and TR1. Provides the container class template std::array, a container for a fixed sized array.
Provides the specialized container class std::bitset, a bit array.
Provides the container class template std::deque, a double-ended queue.
New in C++23. Provides the container adaptor class templates std::flat_map and std::flat_multimap.
New in C++23. Provides the container adaptor class templates std::flat_set and std::flat_multiset.
New in C++11 and TR1. Provides the container class template std::forward_list, a singly linked list.
Provides the container class template std::list, a doubly linked list.
Provides the container class templates std::map and std::multimap, sorted associative array and multimap.
New in C++23. Provides the class template std::mdspan, analogous to std::span but the view is multidimensional.
Provides the container adapter class std::queue, a single-ended queue, and std::priority_queue, a priority queue.
Provides the container class templates std::set and std::multiset, sorted associative containers or sets.
New in C++20. Provides the class template std::span, a non-owning view that refers to any contiguous range.
Provides the container adapter class std::stack, a stack.
New in C++11 and TR1. Provides the container class template std::unordered_map and std::unordered_multimap, hash tables.
New in C++11 and TR1. Provides the container class template std::unordered_set and std::unordered_multiset.
Provides the container class template std::vector, a dynamic array.

Iterators and Ranges
Provides definitions of many container algorithms.
New in C++17. Provides execution policies for parallelized algorithms.
Provides classes and templates for working with iterators.
New in C++20. Provides ranges facilities and lazy evaluated adaptors.

Localization
Defines classes and declares functions that encapsulate and manipulate the information peculiar to a locale.
Provides code conversion facets for various character encodings. This header is deprecated since C++17.

Strings
New in C++17. Provides a locale-independent, non-allocating, and non-throwing string conversion utilities from/to integers and floating point.
New in C++20. Provides a modern way of formatting strings including std::format.
Provides the C++ standard string classes and templates.
New in C++17. Provides class template std::basic_string_view, an immutable non-owning view to any string.
New in C++11. Provides utilities for pattern matching strings using regular expressions.

Streams, Files, and Input/Output
New in C++17. Provides facilities for file system operations and their components.
Provides facilities for file-based input and output. See fstream.
Provides facilities to manipulate output formatting, such as the base used when formatting integers and the precision of floating-point values.
Provides several types and functions basic to the operation of iostreams.
Provides forward declarations of several I/O-related class templates.
Provides C++ input and output fundamentals. See iostream.
Provides std::istream and other supporting classes for input.
Provides std::ostream and other supporting classes for output.
New in C++23. Provides formatted output utilities such as std::print supported for both C and C++ streams.
New in C++23. Provides std::spanstream and other fixed character buffer I/O streams.
Provides std::stringstream and other supporting classes for string manipulation.
Provides reading and writing functionality to/from certain types of character sequences, such as external files or strings.
New in C++20. Provides std::osyncstream and other supporting classes for synchronized output streams.

Thread support library
 New in C++20. Provides std::barrier, a reusable thread barrier.
 New in C++11. In 32.6-1, condition variables provide synchronization primitives used to block a thread until notified by some other thread that some condition is met or until a system time is reached.
 New in C++11. In 32.9.1-1, this section describes components that a C++ program can use to retrieve in one thread the result (value or exception) from a function that has run in the same thread or another thread.
 New in C++20. Provides std::latch, a single-use thread barrier.
 New in C++11. In 32.5-1, this section provides mechanisms for mutual exclusion: mutexes, locks, and call once.
 New in C++14. Provides facitility for shared mutual exclusion.
 New in C++20. Provides semaphore that models non-negative resource count.
 New in C++20. In 32.3.1-1, this section describes components that can be used to asynchronously request that an operation stops execution in a timely manner, typically because the result is no longer required. Such a request is called a stop request.
 New in C++11. Provide class and namespace for working with threads.

Numerics library
Components that C++ programs may use to perform seminumerical operations.
 New in C++20. Provides bit manipulation facility.
 Defines a class template std::complex, and numerous functions for representing and manipulating complex numbers.
 New in C++20. Provides mathematical constants defined in namespace std::numbers.
 New in C++11. Facility for generating (pseudo-)random numbers and distributions.
 New in C++11. Provides compile-time rational arithmetic based on class templates.
 Defines five class templates (std::valarray, std::slice_array, std::gslice_array, std::mask_array, and std::indirect_array), two classes (std::slice and std::gslice), and a series of related function templates for representing and manipulating arrays of values.
 Generalized numeric operations.

C standard library

Each header from the C Standard Library is included in the C++ Standard Library under a different name, generated by removing the .h, and adding a 'c' at the start; for example, 'time.h' becomes 'ctime'. The only difference between these headers and the traditional C Standard Library headers is that where possible the functions should be placed into the std:: namespace. In ISO C, functions in the standard library are allowed to be implemented by macros, which is not allowed by ISO C++.

See also
 Boost (C++ libraries)
 C POSIX library
 C standard library
 Standard library
 C++ Technical Report 1

References

Further reading

External links
 C++ Standard Library reference
 Microsoft C++ Standard Library Reference
 Rogue Wave SourcePro C++ documentation
 Apache C++ Standard Library Wiki, retired 15 May 2014 (based on Rogue Wave C++ Standard Library 4.1.0)
 STLport C++ Standard Library documentation
 The GNU C++ Library online documentation
 LLVM/Clang C++ Standard Library documentation